Verona Marolin Elder (née Verona Bernard) MBE (born 5 April 1953 in Wolverhampton, Staffordshire) is a female British, Commonwealth and European medal winning English 400 metres runner and is now the manager of the British athletics team for people with learning disability.

Athletics career
She made her debut on the international stage at the 1972 Summer Olympics in Munich taking fifth place in the 4 × 400 m relay. The following year she won the 400m title at the European Indoor Championships in Rotterdam, ahead of the East Germans Waltraud Dietsch and Renate Siebach. At the 1974 British Commonwealth Games she finished second in the 400 m and won the 4 × 400 m relay. She retained her European indoor title at the European Indoor Championships in 1975 in Katowice. She was a Finalist in the 400 m and 800 m at the European Championships in 1978. She represented England and won a gold medal in the women's 4 × 400 metres relay event with Jannette Roscoe, Ruth Kennedy and Sue Pettett and a silver medal in the 400 metres, at the 1978 Commonwealth Games in Edmonton, Alberta, Canada. At the start of 1979 season she won gold at the indoor European Indoor Championships in Vienna, Austria, ahead of Jarmila Kratochvílová. She also represented England in the 400 metres hurdles event, at the 1982 Commonwealth Games in Brisbane, Queensland, Australia.

Coaching career
She was a member of the Wolverhampton & Bilston club, Staffordshire. She went on to teach sport to people with learning disability at Thurrock College, Essex. She led Great Britain to six gold, six silver and three bronze medals at the 7th International Sports Federation for Persons with Intellectual Disability (INAS) World Indoor Championships for athletes with learning disabilities as the team manager. With GB finishing second in the medal table behind Portugal at Manchester Sport City. She was Chef de Mission to the 2011 INAS Global Games in Italy on 24 September – 4 October 2011.

References

1953 births
Living people
Sportspeople from Wolverhampton
British female sprinters
English female sprinters
Olympic athletes of Great Britain
Athletes (track and field) at the 1972 Summer Olympics
Athletes (track and field) at the 1976 Summer Olympics
Commonwealth Games gold medallists for England
Commonwealth Games silver medallists for England
Commonwealth Games medallists in athletics
Athletes (track and field) at the 1974 British Commonwealth Games
Athletes (track and field) at the 1978 Commonwealth Games
Athletes (track and field) at the 1982 Commonwealth Games
World Athletics Championships athletes for Great Britain
Olympic female sprinters
Medallists at the 1974 British Commonwealth Games
Medallists at the 1978 Commonwealth Games